DYRF (1215 AM) Radio Fuerza is a radio station owned and operated by Word Broadcasting Corporation. The station's studio is located at Ground Floor, Dingman Bldg., University of San Carlos Downtown Campus, P. del Rosario St. Cebu City, and its transmitter is located at Guinabsan, Brgy. Basak San Nicolas, Cebu City. It operates from Monday to Saturday 3:30 AM to 12:00 MN, and Sunday from 4:45 AM to 11:00 PM.

References

Radio stations in Metro Cebu
Radio stations established in 1968
News and talk radio stations in the Philippines